Jardel Santana da Silva (born 10 December 1978 in Natal, Rio Grande do Norte, Brazil) is a Brazilian footballer. He normally plays as a midfielder, and is a former player for Persisam and Persma Manado. He is currently playing for Liga Primer Indonesia side Manado United.

External links
 Video : Jardel Santana at YouTube

References

1978 births
Living people
Expatriate footballers in Indonesia
Brazilian footballers
Association football midfielders
Brazilian expatriate sportspeople in Indonesia
Brazilian expatriate footballers
Persisam Putra Samarinda players
Indonesian Premier Division players
People from Natal, Rio Grande do Norte
Sportspeople from Rio Grande do Norte